is a Japanese kickboxer, currently competing in the bantamweight division of RISE. Between December 2021 and June 2022, Combat Press ranked him as the tenth best flyweight in the world.

Kickboxing career

Early career
Kyotani was scheduled to face Jom OishiGym at RKS Fist Runaway Typhoon Legend vol.1 on March 6, 2016. He won the fight by a second-round technical knockout.

Kyotani was scheduled to face Yuta “Cat” Hamamoto at REBELS 44 on July 10, 2016. He won the fight by a wide unanimous decision, with scores of 30-24, 30-24 and 30-24.

Kyotani participated in a one-night Hoost Cup West Japan Top Fighter 55 kg tournament. He faced Shuhei Kumura in the semifinals, whom he beat by unanimous decision, with scores of 30-29, 30-29 and 30-28. Kyotani advanced to the tournament finals, where he faced KING Kyosuke. He lost the final match by unanimous decision, with scores of 30-27, 29-28 and 29-28.

RISE
Kyotani was scheduled to face Azusa Kaneko at RISE WORLD SERIES 2019 Final Round on September 16, 2019. He won the fight by a second-round technical knockout, stopping Kaneko with a flurry of punches at the 2:09 minute mark.

Kyotani faced Shiro Matsumoto at Rise 136 on January 13, 2020. He lost the fight by majority decision, with scores of 30-29, 29-29 and 30-29.

Kyotani was expected to fight Rasta Kido in the reserve match of the 2020 RISE Asia Series tournament, at the April 12, 2020, RISE Word Series event. The entire event was later postponed due to the COVID-19 pandemic.

Kyotani was scheduled to face the former two-weight WMC Japan champion David Chibana at Rise 141 on August 23, 2021. He won the fight by unanimous decision, with scores of 29-28, 29-28 and 30-28.

Kyotani was scheduled to face Yosuke at Rise Dead or Alive 2020 Osaka on November 1, 2020. He won the fight by unanimous decision, with scores of 30-29, 30-28 and 30-29.

Kyotani was expected to fight Kyosuke, who was moving up to RISE's bantamweight division from super flyweight, at Rise 149 on May 23, 2021. On April 24, 2021, it was revealed that Kyosuke had withdrawn from the bout due to a left lunate fracture, and would be replaced by the DEEP KICK bantamweight champion Ryoga Terayama. The fight was ruled a unanimous decision draw after the first three rounds, with scores of 30-30, 29-29 and 30-30. An extension round was fought, after which the fight was once again ruled a draw by unanimous decision, with all three judges scoring it 10-10.

Kyotani was scheduled to face the Shootboxing Japan bantamweight champion Kyo Kawakami at Rise World Series 2021 Osaka on July 18, 2021, in his hometown of Osaka. He lost the fight by unanimous decision, with all three judges awarding Kawakami a 30-29 scorecard.

Kyotani was scheduled to face the reigning Shootboxing Japan super bantamweight champion Seiki Ueyama at Rise World Series 2021 Osaka 2 on November 14, 2021, once again fighting in his hometown. He won the fight by technical decision, with all three judges scoring the fight 30-29 in his favor. The fight was stopped due to a cut above Ueyama's left ear, which was caused by an accidental headbutt.

Kyotani was booked to face Takuya at RISE 155 on February 23, 2022. He won the fight by a second-round technical knockout.

Kyotani was booked to face Ryunosuke Omori at RISE World Series Osaka 2022 on August 21, 2022. He lost the fight by a second-round knockout.

Kyotani faced Yugo Kato at RISE 166 -RISE 20th Memorial event- on February 23, 2023.

Fight record

|-  style="background:#fbb;"
| 2023-02-23 || Loss ||align=left| Yugo Kato || RISE 166 -RISE 20th Memorial event- || Tokyo, Japan || KO (Left straight) || 2 ||2:29
|-
|-  style="background:#fbb;"
| 2022-08-21 || Loss ||align=left| Ryunosuke Omori ||  RISE WORLD SERIES OSAKA 2022 || Osaka, Japan || KO (Knee to the body) || 2 || 1:39

|-  style="background:#cfc;
| 2022-02-23|| Win || align=left| Takuya || Rise 155 || Tokyo, Japan || TKO (Corner stoppage) || 2 || 0:49
|-
|-  style="background:#cfc;"
| 2021-11-14|| Win || align=left| Seiki Ueyama || Rise World Series 2021 Osaka 2 || Osaka, Japan || Tech. Decision (Unanimous)  ||3 || 
|-
|-  style="background:#fbb;"
| 2021-07-18 || Loss || align=left| Kyo Kawakami || Rise World Series 2021 Osaka || Osaka, Japan || Decision (Unanimous)  || 3 || 3:00
|-
|-  style="background:#c5d2ea;"
| 2021-05-23 || Draw || align=left| Ryoga Terayama || Rise 149 || Tokyo, Japan || Ext. R. Decision (Unanimous)  || 4 || 3:00
|-
|-  style="background:#cfc;"
| 2020-11-01 || Win || align=left| Yosuke || Rise Dead or Alive 2020 Osaka || Osaka, Japan || Decision (Unanimous)  || 3 || 3:00
|-
|-  style="background:#cfc;"
| 2020-08-23 || Win || align=left| David Chibana || Rise 141 || Tokyo, Japan || Decision (Unanimous)  || 3 || 3:00
|-
|-  style="background:#fbb;"
| 2020-01-13 || Loss || align=left| Shiro Matsumoto || Rise 136 || Tokyo, Japan || Decision (Majority)  || 3 || 3:00
|-
|-  style="background:#cfc;"
| 2019-09-16 || Win || align=left| Azusa Kaneko || RISE WORLD SERIES 2019 Final Round || Chiba, Japan || TKO (Punches) || 2 || 2:09
|-
|-  style="background:#fbb;"
| 2016-10-02 || Loss || align=left| KING Kyosuke || Hoost Cup, Tournament Finals || Tokyo, Japan || Decision (Unanimous) || 3 || 3:00
|-
|-  style="background:#cfc;"
| 2016-10-02 || Win || align=left| Shuhei Kumura || Hoost Cup, Tournament Semifinals || Tokyo, Japan || Decision (Unanimous) || 3 || 3:00
|-
|-  style="background:#cfc;"
| 2016-07-10 || Win || align=left| Yuta “Cat” Hamamoto || REBELS 44 || Tokyo, Japan || Decision (Unanimous) || 3 || 3:00
|-
|-  style="background:#cfc;"
| 2016-03-06 || Win || align=left| Jom OishiGym || RKS Fist Runaway Typhoon Legend vol.1 || Tokyo, Japan || TKO || 2 || 1:22
|-
|-  style="background:#c5d2ea;"
| 2015-02-22 || Draw || align=left| Yuichi || DEEP KICK 24 || Tokyo, Japan || Decision (Split)  || 3 || 3:00
|-
|-  style="background:#cfc;"
| 2013-09-22 || Win || align=left| Yuta Kiuchi || DEEP KICK 17 || Tokyo, Japan || TKO (Punches) || 2 || 1:02
|-
|-  style="background:#cfc;"
| 2012-06-08 || Win || align=left| Takeru Segawa || Krush 19 || Tokyo, Japan || TKO (Doctor Stoppage/Broken nose) || 1 || 3:00
|-
|-  style="background:#fbb;"
| 2012-02-05|| Loss || align=left| Seiya Rokugawa || DEEP KICK 10 || Tokyo, Japan || KO (Left hook) || 2 || 1:11
|-
|-  style="background:#cfc;"
| 2011-12-25|| Win || align=left| Tatsuya Tsuda || DEEP KICK 9 || Tokyo, Japan || KO (Right straight) || 3 || 2:55
|-
|-  style="background:#cfc;"
| 2011-10-23 || Win || align=left| Takuya Takahashi  || DEEP KICK 8 || Tokyo, Japan || TKO (Punches) || 3 || 2_57
|-
|-  style="background:#cfc;"
| 2011-04-10 || Win || align=left| Daisuke Murata || DEEP KICK 6 || Tokyo, Japan || Decision (Unanimous) || 3 || 3:00
|-
|-  style="background:#fbb;"
| 2010-12-12 || Loss || align=left| Chalermchai Togerhan || DEEP KICK 5 || Tokyo, Japan || KO (Right high kick) || 2 || 2:14
|-
|-  style="background:#cfc;"
| 2010-08-08 || Win || align=left| Shoyuki || DEEP KICK 4 || Tokyo, Japan || KO || 1 || 2:42
|-
|-  style="background:#cfc;"
| 2010-04-04 || Win || align=left| Kouzi || DEEP KICK 3 || Tokyo, Japan || Decision (Unanimous) || 3 || 3:00
|-
|-  style="background:#fbb;"
| 2009-07-26 || Loss || align=left| Daiki Nagashima || J-FIGHT in SHINJYUKU vol.10 || Tokyo, Japan || KO (Right straight) || 2 || 1:06
|-
|-  style="background:#fbb;"
| 2008-10-03 || Loss || align=left| Hiroyuki Yamano || Let’s Kick with J the 4th || Tokyo, Japan || KO || 2 || 1:50
|-
|-  style="background:#cfc;"
| 2008-04-13 || Win|| align=left| Kenbo || POWER GATE Kaiser Grand Prix in Kyoto KBS Hall 2nd || Tokyo, Japan || TKO || 2 || 0:51
|-
| colspan=9 | Legend:

References

1988 births
Living people
Japanese male kickboxers
Flyweight kickboxers
Sportspeople from Osaka